This list, 2018 in paleomalacology, is a list of new taxa of ammonites and other fossil cephalopods, as well as fossil gastropods, bivalves and other molluscs that are scheduled to be described during the year 2018, as well as other significant discoveries and events related to molluscan paleontology that are scheduled to occur in the year 2018.

General research
 A study on the impact of the Paleocene–Eocene Thermal Maximum on the richness, turnover, or ecological structure of shallow marine molluscan faunas from the Gulf Coastal Plain, or on the body size, growth rate, or life span of component taxa, is published by Ivany et al. (2018).
 A study on the basal metabolic rate of Pliocene to recent bivalves and gastropods from the Western Atlantic is published by Strotz et al. (2018).
 A study evaluating how faithfully stratigraphic ranges of extant Adriatic molluscs are recorded in a series of cores drilled through alluvial, coastal and shallow-marine strata of the Po Plain (Italy) is published by Nawrot et al. (2018), who also evaluate the implications of their study for interpretations of the timing, duration and ecological selectivity of mass extinction events in general.

Ammonites

Research
 A study on the life history and habits of ammonites as indicated by measurements of their conchs is published by Walton & Korn (2018).
 A study on the life mode of ammonite hatchlings, as indicated by the oxygen and carbon isotope composition of the embryonic shells and early postembryonic whorls of five juveniles of Hoploscaphites comprimus from the Fox Hills Formation (South Dakota, United States), is published by Linzmeier et al. (2018).
 A study on the succession of latest Permian ammonite fossils in Iran is published by Kiessling et al. (2018), who interpret their findings as indicating that Permian–Triassic extinction event had a prelude leading to extinction pulses, a decline of body size and morphological simplification in latest Permian ammonites.
 A study on the distribution and abundance of Early Triassic ammonites from the western United States basin is published by Jattiot et al. (2018).
 A study testing whether the Rapoport effect can be observed among the early Pliensbachian ammonites from the area of the present-day Europe, the Middle East and North Africa is published by Zacaï et al. (2018).
 A study on the number of eggs laid by large adult females of Cretaceous ammonites and belemnites, as well as on the ecological niches occupied by juvenile ammonites and belemnites, is published by Tajika, Nützel & Klug (2018).
 Ammonite nuclei (earliest whorls), representing a rare case of preservation of very early ontogenetic stages of ammonites and indicating high juvenile mortality that is seldom recorded in the fossil record of this group, are described from the Cretaceous (upper Turonian to Coniacian) of Tanzania by Ifrim, Wendler & Lehmann (2018), who interpret their finding as indicating that the mating and spawning areas of ammonites were locally restricted, and that their earliest ontogenetic stages were probably distributed by currents passing by their mating and spawning areas, similar to extant coleoids.
 A study on the paleoecology of the ammonites belonging to the genera Baculites and Scaphites, as indicated by the intracolonial variance in the size of zooids of cheilostome bryozoans that colonized the internal body chambers of the shells of these ammonites once they settled to the seafloor following the death of the ammonite, is published by Berry (2018).
 A study on the growth of spines in Kimmeridgian aspidoceratids, Turonian euomphaloceratines and Coniacian collignoniceratids is published by Ifrim, Bengtson & Schweigert (2018).
 A study on the suture lines in Cretaceous ammonite genera and on the link between suture complexity and generic longevity in ammonites is published by Pérez-Claros & Bengtson (2018).
 A study on the ammonite turnover events during the broad ‘mid-Cretaceous’ interval is published by Bengtson & Kakabadze (2018).
 A sclerochronological study of shell material from seep and age-equivalent non-seep specimens of Baculites compressus, aiming to test the hypothesis that methane seeps provided a habitat for ammonites, is published by Landman et al. (2018).

New taxa

Other cephalopods

Research
 A study on the relationship between egg size, maximum size of embryonic shells and the size of the initial chamber in extant cephalopods, and on its implications for inferring reproductive strategies of fossil cephalopods, is published by Laptikhovsky, Nikolaeva & Rogov (2018).
 Mironenko (2018) proposes a new hypothesis about the habits and feeding strategies of endocerids, interpreting them as planktotrophic cephalopods, and arguing that the largest of endocerids were suspension feeders.
 Antarcticeras nordenskjoeldi Doguzhaeva in Doguzhaeva et al. (2017), originally assigned to a new cephalopod subclass Paracoleoidea and the new order Antarcticerida, is reinterpreted as a possible member of Oegopsida by Fuchs, Keupp & Klug (2018); this reinterpretation is subsequently criticized and rejected by Doguzhaeva (2018).
 A study on the changes of body size of orthoconic cephalopods known from late Silurian to late Devonian sediments in Morocco is published by Pohle & Klug (2018).
 De Baets & Munnecke (2018) report presence of bimineralic, partially calcitic shell in two orthoconic nautiloids (members of the genus Dawsonoceras from the Silurian of Sweden, and members of the genus Spyroceras from the Devonian of Morocco), unlike extant and some fossil shelled cephalopods with an aragonitic shell wall, but similar to shells of some bivalves and gastropods.
 A study on the belemnites from the Lower Jurassic localities in Buttenheim (Germany) and Lixhausen (France), focusing on changes in spacing of septa that divided the phragmocone into chambers during the animals' growth, as well as their implications for the anatomy of belemnite hatchlings, is published by Wani et al. (2018).
 A study on belemnite rostra from two Toarcian belemnite battlefields in the Buttenheim and Teufelsgraben localities (Franconia, Germany), examining whether a rostrum size difference can be recognized between the studied samples, is published by Rita, De Baets & Schlott (2018).
 A pathological belemnite rostrum, indicative of the presence of a parasite during the lifetime of the belemnite, is described from the Cretaceous (Santonian) Bavnodde Greensand (Denmark) by Hoffmann et al. (2018).
 A study on the taxonomy, stratigraphy and palaeobiogeography of the late early Maastrichtian Belemnella lineage from the eastern part of the Roztocze Hills (Poland), comparing it with forms known from western Europe and easterly areas as far the peri-Aralian Sea area of Kazakhstan, and assessing their implications for inferring the taxonomic diversification and possible migratory patterns of members of the genus Belemnella in general, is published by Remin (2018).
 The oldest known fossil ink sac of the cuttlefish belonging to the genus Sepia, preserving original eumelanin and melanosomes, is described from the Miocene (Serravallian) deposits of the Vienna Basin by Košťák et al. (2018).
 Janiszewska et al. (2018) report aragonite preservation in ammonite and nautilid specimens from Upper Cretaceous siliceous limestone sections in Poland and Ukraine, and illustrate a broad spectrum of preservation of originally aragonitic structures in these specimens.

New taxa

Gastropods

Research
 A study on the evolutionary history of endemic genera of Late Cretaceous shallow-marine gastropods from the rim of the Northeast Pacific (a region extending from the Alaska Peninsula southward to the northern part of Baja California Sur, Mexico) is published by Squires (2018).
 New fossil material of "Pleurotomaria" perlata is described from the Silurian Niagara Group (Ohio, United States) by Peel (2018), who interprets new fossils as indicating that "P." perlata wasn't a pleurotomariid vetigastropod, and transfers this species to the genus Isfarispira.
 A study on the effect of climatic cooling on the cannibalistic behaviour of members of the genus Falsilunatia from the Eocene La Meseta Formation (Antarctica) is published by Dietl, Nagel-Myers & Aronson (2018).
 A study on predatory traces in gastropod specimens collected from middle Eocene beds of the Paris Basin and the lower Miocene Chipola Formation in Florida, and on their implications for inferring possible correlations between the shell morphology and the vulnerability to predators in fossil marine gastropods, is published by Ishikawa, Kase & Tsutsui (2018).

New taxa

Other molluscs

Research
 A study on patterns of subtle morphological variation in two assemblages of the Cambrian helcionelloid Mackinnonia rostrata from the Shackleton Limestone of Antarctica and Ajax Limestone of Australia, and an assemblage of M. taconica from the Bastion Formation of Greenland, is published by Jackson & Claybourn (2018).
 The oldest known evidence of trematode parasitism of bivalves in the form of igloo-shaped traces found on shells of the freshwater bivalve Sphaerium is reported from the Upper Cretaceous Judith River Formation (Montana, United States) by Rogers et al. (2018).
 A study evaluating the association of past climate changes with extinction in Cenozoic marine bivalves is published by Edie et al. (2018).
 The oldest known shipworms reported so far, preserved with silicified soft parts, are described from the mid-Cretaceous logs of the Envigne Valley (France) by Robin et al. (2018).
 A study on the taphonomy and paleoecology of oyster mass occurrences from the Cretaceous (Hauterivian) Neuquén Basin (west-central Argentina), dominated by the gryphaeid small oyster Ceratostreon, is published by Toscano, Lazo & Luci (2018).
 Evidence of exceptional preservation in the nacre and prismatic layers of a 66-million-years-old bivalve shell (of a member of the genus Pinna from the Owl Creek Formation, Mississippi, United States) is presented by Myers et al. (2018).
 A study on the allometric growth of shells of the Cenozoic burrowing bivalves Claibornicardia paleopatagonica and Crassatella kokeni from Argentina is published by Perez & Santelli (2018).
 Macrobioerosion of silicate siltstone rocks caused by extant rock-boring mussels is reported from a freshwater section of the Kaladan River (Myanmar) by Bolotov et al. (2018), who note the similarity of recent Kaladan borings to borings assigned to the ichnotaxon Gastrochaenolites anauchen from the Carboniferous deposits of the United States, and interpret their discovery as indicating that rocks with macroborings and fossilized members of rock-boring communities are not necessarily a direct indicator of shallow marine paleo-environments, but may also reflect freshwater habitats.
 A study comparing declines in taxonomic and functional diversity in marine bivalves during the Permian–Triassic extinction event, Cretaceous–Paleogene extinction event and in present times is published by Edie, Jablonski & Valentine (2018).

New taxa

References

Molluscs described in 2018
2018 in paleontology
Paleomalacology